The 1972–73 Georgetown Hoyas men's basketball team represented Georgetown University during the 1972–73 NCAA University Division college basketball season. John Thompson, coached them in his first season as head coach. The team was an independent and played its home games at McDonough Gymnasium on the Georgetown campus in Washington, D.C. It finished the season with a record of 12-14 – a significant improvement over the previous seasons record – was not ranked in the Top 20 in the Associated Press Poll or Coaches' Poll at any time, and had no post-season play.

John Thompson arrives
The 29-year-old Thompson was only the third African-American head coach in the history of NCAA Division basketball and was the first to take charge of a major college basketball program. He had been a star player for Washington, D.C.s Archbishop Carroll High School and for Providence College, had played for two successful seasons with the Boston Celtics in the National Basketball Association, and then had returned to Washington, D.C., to coach St. Anthony's High School to a record of 122-28 in six seasons.

At Georgetown, Thompson inherited a team that had gone 3-23 the previous season, the culmination of a 25-year stretch of mostly undistinguished basketball at Georgetown. Although the team had appeared in the National Invitation Tournament in 1953 and 1970, between the 1947-48 season and the end of the previous season Georgetown had posted an overall record under .500 and its total of 296 wins during those 25 seasons was the lowest among the 32 Catholic universities playing Division I college basketball in the United States. The team also had had no NCAA tournament appearances since 1943.

Thompsons arrival heralded the schools rise to the status of a national basketball power; the 12-14 record this season was a significant improvement over the 3-23 finish of the previous year, and the 1972-73 squad was the last Georgetown men's basketball team to finish with a losing record until the 1998–99 season. Georgetown had hired Thompson in the hope that he could guide the Hoyas to an "occasional" National Invitation Tournament (NIT) appearance, but during his 26½ seasons as head coach he would lead the Hoyas to 24 straight post-season tournaments – 19 NCAA tournaments and five NITs – from the 1974-75 to the 1997-98 seasons, and to the national championship in the 1983-84 season.

Season recap

Thompsons first recruiting class consisted of five players. One of them was center Merlin Wilson, who had played for him at St. Anthonys and followed him to Georgetown to play college basketball. Wilson scored 24 points in the season opener against Saint Francis. At Loyola, the Hoyas outrebounded the Greyhounds 65-33, and Wilson pulled down 24 of Georgetowns rebounds. By mid-season, Wilson was averaging 12 points and 13 rebounds a game, a level of play unknown at Georgetown for many years, and was among the top ten college players in rebounds; a Tampa Tribune columnist wrote that the Hoyas were "a team destined to be one of the next great powers in college basketball" because of Wilsons talent. He scored 25 points and had 17 rebounds and eight blocks against Navy, had a 17-point, 17-rebound performance against Fordham in a big win, and had 15 points and 16 rebounds against St. Mary's in the last home game of the season. He finished the season as the teams leader in scoring and rebounds, and was ranked 14th in the United States with 14.1 rebounds per game.

Another major Thompson recruit for his first season as a collegiate head coach was guard Jonathan Smith. Smith, like Wilson, had played for Thompson at St. Anthonys and followed him to Georgetown. Although some observers expected Smith to be a reserve, he quickly emerged as a major force for the Hoyas, scoring a career-high 25 points twice during the season, against Penn State and George Washington. Smith finished the season second on the team only to Wilson in scoring.

Roster

1972–73 schedule and results

Sources

|-
!colspan=9 style="background:#002147; color:#8D817B;"| Regular Season

References

Georgetown Hoyas men's basketball seasons
Georgetown
Georgetown Hoyas men's basketball team
Georgetown Hoyas men's basketball team